Flight Lieutenant Arthur Clunie Randall  (b. 6 February 1896) was a Scottish World War I flying ace credited with 10 aerial victories.
 After earning a Distinguished Flying Cross during the war, he remained in military service until 1926.

Early life
Arthur Clunie Randall was born in Paisley, Scotland, on 6 February 1896. When he enlisted in the military, he was living in Bothwell, Lanarkshire.

World War I
On 13 November 1914, Randall was among cadets and ex-cadets of the Officers' Training Corps appointed as temporary second lieutenants in the infantry. After serving in a reserve battalion of the Border Regiment, he was attached to the Royal Flying Corps on 27 October 1916, and appointed a flying officer, transferred to the General List, on 30 November. He was posted to No. 32 Squadron, flying an Airco DH.2. He scored his first aerial victory with them on 23 January 1917. He would score one more win with them, being wounded in the process, on 11 March 1917. On 1 April 1917 he was promoted to lieutenant, and on 3 June was appointed a flight commander with the temporary rank of captain. His second combat tour was as a fighter pilot with No. 85 Squadron, flying a Royal Aircraft Factory SE.5a. This time around, he scored another eight aerial victories, between June and October 1918, culminating in the award of the Distinguished Flying Cross just days before the Armistice. His citation read:
Captain Arthur Clunie Randall.
"A daring and skilful airman who during recent operations has accounted for six enemy aeroplanes. He is conspicuous for his determination and devotion to duty."

List of aerial victories

Post-war career
Randall remained in the RAF after the war, being granted a permanent commission with the rank of captain on 1 August 1919. He was then serving in the campaign in the Baltic in which British forces supported the White Army against the Reds in the Russian Civil War. Randall took part in the Raid on Kronstadt on the night of 17/18 August 1919. He flew one of the eight aircraft that created a diversion while Royal Navy Coastal Motor Boats attacked Russian warships. However, Randall suffered an engine failure en route. He was just about to land when his engine came back to life, and despite knowing that it could fail again at any time, he pressed on to take part in the attack. His engine failed completely on the return journey. On 26 March 1920, Randall was awarded the Cross of Liberty Second Class by the government of Estonia, in recognition of his services during the Estonian War of Independence.

Randall then served in No. 210 Squadron, based at RAF Gosport, until 30 January 1922 when he was transferred to No. 203 Squadron, based at RAF Leuchars. However he was soon transferred again, moving to the RAF Depot (Inland Area) as a supernumerary on 3 April. From 6 January 1923 he served as adjutant of the Inland Area Aircraft Depot.

Randall was dismissed from the Royal Air Force by sentence of a General Court-Martial on 23 December 1926. He reportedly emigrated to Dominica, in the Caribbean, settled in the village of Delices, and was still living there up until 1948.

See also
 List of World War I aces credited with 10 victories
 Aerial victory standards of World War I

References

1896 births
Year of death unknown
Military personnel from Paisley, Renfrewshire
Border Regiment officers
Royal Flying Corps officers
Royal Air Force officers
Recipients of the Distinguished Flying Cross (United Kingdom)
Scottish flying aces
British World War I flying aces